Characiopsis elegans is a species of freshwater yellow-green algae in the family Characiopsidaceae. It is described from Arkansas, North America and Brazil, South America.

References

External links
 Characiopsis elegans at algaebase
 Characiopsis elegans at the World Register of Marine Species

Xanthophyceae
Species described in 1956